The 2022–23 season is the 98th in the history of Ternana Calcio and their second consecutive season in the top flight. The club will participate in Serie B and Coppa Italia.

Players

Out on loan

Transfers

Pre-season and friendlies

Competitions

Overall record

Serie B

League table

Results summary

Results by round

Matches 
The league fixtures will be announced on 15 July 2022.

Coppa Italia

References 

Ternana Calcio
Ternana